Lashar is the largest village in the southeastern province Sistan and Baluchestan in Iran.

Most of the people of Lashar are Afro-Iranians, many of whom were taken to the south of Iran by Portuguese as well as Persian and Arab slave traders.

See also

Afro Iranian

References

African diaspora in the Middle East
Populated places in Sistan and Baluchestan Province